is a Japanese former professional baseball pitcher who is currently a pitching coach for the Yokohama DeNA BayStars of Nippon Professional Baseball (NPB). He has played in Nippon Professional Baseball (NPB) for the Fukuoka SoftBank Hawks, Hokkaido Nippon-Ham Fighters and BayStars.

Career

On March 26, 2006, Fujioka made his NPB debut.

On November 28, 2020, Fujioka announced his retirement and become pitching coach for the BayStars.

References

External links

 NPB.com

1985 births
Living people
Baseball people from Osaka Prefecture
Fukuoka SoftBank Hawks players
Hokkaido Nippon-Ham Fighters players
Japanese baseball coaches
Japanese baseball players
Nippon Professional Baseball coaches
Nippon Professional Baseball pitchers
People from Toyonaka, Osaka
Yokohama DeNA BayStars players